Koratagere Assembly constituency is one of the 224 constituencies in the Karnataka Legislative Assembly of Karnataka a south state of India. It is also part of Tumkur Lok Sabha constituency.

Members of Legislative Assembly

Mysore State (Koratagere Madhugiri constituency)
 1951 (Seat-1): R. Channigaramaiah, Indian National Congress
 1951 (Seat-2): Mudduramaiah, Indian National Congress

Mysore State (Madhugiri constituency)
 1957 (Seat-1): R. Channigaramaiah, Indian National Congress
 1957 (Seat-2): Mali Mariyappa, Indian National Congress

Mysore State (Koratagere constituency)
 1962: R. Channigaramaiah, Indian National Congress

 1967: T. S. Shivanna, Indian National Congress

 1972: Muddaramaiah, Indian National Congress

Karnataka State
 1978: Muddaramaiah, Indian National Congress (Indira)

 1983: C. Veeranna, Janata Party

 1985: C. Veeranna, Janata Party

 1989: C. Veerabhadraiah, Indian National Congress

 1994: C. Channigappa, Janata Dal

 1999: C. Channigappa, Janata Dal (Secular)

 2004: C. Channigappa, Janata Dal (Secular)

 2008: G. Parameshwara, Indian National Congress

 2013: P. R. Sudhakara Lal, Janata Dal (Secular)

 2018: G. Parameshwara, Indian National Congress

See also
 List of constituencies of Karnataka Legislative Assembly
 Tumkur district

References

Assembly constituencies of Karnataka
Tumkur district